The 2022 South American Under-20 Women's Football Championship was the 10th edition of the South American Under-20 Women's Football Championship, the biennial international youth football championship organised by CONMEBOL for the women's under-20 national teams of South America. It was held in La Calera, Chile from 6 to 24 April 2022.

The top two teams of the tournament qualified for the 2022 FIFA U-20 Women's World Cup in Costa Rica as the CONMEBOL representatives.

Brazil were the defending champions having won the title in 2018 since the final stage of the 2020 edition ended up being cancelled due to the COVID-19 pandemic and consequently there was no champion for that year. Brazil successfully retained their title and won their ninth in a row after finish first in the final stage and alongside the runners-up Colombia qualified for the 2022 FIFA U-20 Women's World Cup.

Teams
All ten CONMEBOL member national teams are eligible to enter the tournament.

Venues

Chile was named as host country of the tournament at the CONMEBOL Council meeting held on 27 October 2021. The Estadio Municipal Nicolás Chahuán Nazar in La Calera will host all the matches.

Draw
The draw was held on 11 March 2022, 12:00 PYST (UTC−3), at the CONMEBOL headquarters in Luque, Paraguay. The hosts Chile and the title holders Brazil were seeded and assigned to the head of the groups A and B respectively. The remaining eight teams were split into four "pairing pots" (Paraguay-Colombia, Venezuela-Ecuador, Argentina-Uruguay, Peru-Bolivia) based on the final placement they reached in the 2018 edition of the tournament (shown in brackets).

From each pot, the first team drawn was placed into Group A and the second team drawn was placed into Group B. In both groups, teams from pot 1 were allocated in position 2, teams from pot 2 in position 3, teams from pot 3 in position 4 and teams from pot 4 in position 5.

The draw resulted in the following groups:

Squads

Players born between 1 January 2002 and 31 December 2006 are eligible to compete in the tournament. Each team could register a maximum of 22 and a minimum of 18 players, including at least 2 goalkeepers (Regulations Article 29).

Match officials
On 21 March 2022, CONMEBOL announced the referees appointed for the tournament. For the first time the tournament featured the participation of a UEFA refereeing team as part of the memorandum of understanding signed by CONMEBOL and UEFA in February 2020, which included a referee exchange programme. Referee Helena Cantero was replaced by Zulma Quiñónez, both from Paraguay.

 Roberta Echeverría
Assistants: Gisela Truco and Gisela Bosso
 Jhanet Portugal
Assistants: Inés Choque and Elizabeth Blanco
 Thayslane de Melo
Assistants: Barbara Da Costa and Brigida Cirilo
 Madelaine Rojas
Assistants: Loreto Toloza and Leslie Vásquez
 Jenny Arias
Assistants: Nataly Arteaga and Carolina Vicuña

 María Zamora
Assistants: Viviana Segura and Nataly Ramírez
 Zulma Quiñónez
Assistants: Nilda Gamarra and Nancy Fernández
 Milagros Arruela
Assistants: Vera Yupanqui and Mariana Aquino
 Silvia Ríos
Assistants: Adela Sánchez and Daiana Fernández
 Yercinia Correa
Assistants: Migdalia Rodríguez and Laura Cárdenas

UEFA Refereeing team
 Maria Sole Ferrieri
Assistants:  Eliana Fernández González and  Giulia Tempestilli

First stage
In the first stage, the teams are ranked according to points earned (3 points for a win, 1 point for a draw, 0 points for a loss). If tied on points, tiebreakers are applied in the following order (Regulations Article 20):
Head-to-head result in games between tied teams;
Points in the matches played between the teams in question;
Goal difference in the matches played between the teams in question;
Number of goals scored in the matches played between the teams in question;
Goal difference in all group matches;
Number of goals scored in all group matches;
Fewest red cards received;
Fewest yellow cards received
Drawing of lots.

The top two teams of each group advance to the final stage.

All match times are in CLT (UTC−4), as listed by CONMEBOL.

Group A

Group B

Final stage
In the final stage, the teams are ranked according to points earned (3 points for a win, 1 point for a draw, 0 points for a loss). If tied on points, the same tiebreakers as in the first stage are applied, taking into account only matches in the final stage (Regulations Article 21):

All match times are in CLT (UTC−4), as listed by CONMEBOL.

Goalscorers

Qualified teams for FIFA U-20 Women's World Cup
The following two teams from CONMEBOL qualify for the 2022 FIFA U-20 Women's World Cup.

1 Bold indicates champions for that year. Italic indicates hosts for that year.

Notes

References

External links
CONMEBOL Sub 20 Femenina Chile 2022, CONMEBOL.com

South American U-20 Women's Championship
Women's U-20
South American
South American
South American
International association football competitions hosted by Chile
South American